NFPA 1670 (Standard on Operations and Training for Technical Search and Rescue Incidents) is a standard published by the National Fire Protection Association.

Purpose 
This standard shall identify and establish levels of functional capability for conducting operations at technical search and rescue incidents while minimizing threats to rescuers.

NFPA Standards
Fire protection
Rescue